Peter G. Casazza, born June 28, 1945 in Albany, New York, is an American mathematician, presently working at the University of Missouri. He began his career as a Banach space theorist, but he is perhaps most well known for his role in the development of frame (linear algebra) theory as a popular discipline of mathematical research.

Casazza has over 100 publications, several of which are coauthored with his wife, Janet Tremain.

He is an active mathematical researcher and currently runs the Frame Research Center in Columbia, Missouri.

References

20th-century American mathematicians
21st-century American mathematicians
University of Missouri faculty
People from Columbia, Missouri
Mathematicians from Missouri
1945 births
Living people